The Brothers Karamazov is a 1921 German silent drama film directed by Carl Froelich and an uncredited Dimitri Buchowetzki and starring Fritz Kortner, Bernhard Goetzke, and Emil Jannings. It is an adaptation of the 1880 novel The Brothers Karamazov by Fyodor Dostoevsky.

Cast

References

External links

Films of the Weimar Republic
German silent feature films
German historical drama films
1920s historical drama films
Films directed by Carl Froelich
Films directed by Dimitri Buchowetzki
Films based on The Brothers Karamazov
Films set in Russia
Films set in the 19th century
UFA GmbH films
German black-and-white films
1921 drama films
Silent drama films
1920s German films
1920s German-language films